Theatre Workshop Scotland (TWS) is a theatre and film production and development company, based in Edinburgh, Scotland. TWS aims to give a voice to marginalised groups, including immigrants and the disabled.

History
TWS was founded in 1965 as Theatre Workshop Edinburgh, by Catherine Robbins and Ros Clark. It was Edinburgh's first drama centre for children. In 1970, Theatre Workshop moved from St Mark's Unitarian Church on Castle Terrace, to its own premises at Hanover Street.
Since 1996, Robert Rae has been Artistic Director, and has directed, devised and written twenty professional shows and ten large-scale productions with non-actors. Actors including Ewen Bremner have had their first acting opportunities at TWS. In 2009, the company announced that due to financial constraints, they would have to move out of their premises on Hamilton Place.

Aims
Theatre Workshop Scotland aims to create well crafted, challenging film and theatre, which will inspire and empower individuals and organisations to change themselves and the world around them. TWS aims to put the people their productions deal with at the heart of the creative process, and has championed the employment of professional disabled actors. It was the first fully inclusive professional theatre in Europe, routinely incorporating disabled actors into its main productions.

Productions

Degenerate
TWS hosts the annual "Degenerate" festival, the only international disability arts festival held in Scotland.

Trouble Sleeping
In 2007, TWS produced Trouble Sleeping, a feature film based around the experiences of refugees in Edinburgh, which premiered at the Edinburgh International Film Festival. It was later screened on BBC2, and won a number of awards, including Best New Work at the BAFTA Scotland New Talent Awards, and Best Film at the 2008 Peace on Earth Film Festival, Rockport Film Festival, and Southern Appalachian International Film Festival. Several of the actors involved were also nominated for Best Actor awards at film festivals.

References

External links
Trouble Sleeping - film produced by TWS

Theatre companies in Scotland
Film production companies of the United Kingdom
Theatre in Edinburgh